Liberty is a town in Center Township, Union County, Indiana, United States of America. The population was 2,000 at the 2020 census. It is the county seat of Union County.

History
The Liberty post office has been in operation since 1824.

The Liberty Courthouse Square Historic District, Liberty Residential Historic District, and Union County Courthouse are listed on the National Register of Historic Places.

Geography

Demographics

2010 census
As of the census of 2010, there were 2,133 people, 832 households, and 558 families living in the town. The racial makeup of the town was 96.8% White, 0.8% African American, 0.3% Native American, 0.4% Asian, 0.1% Pacific Islander, 0.8% from other races, and 0.9% from two or more races. Hispanic or Latino people of any race were 1.5% of the population.

There were 832 households, of which 39.1% had children under the age of 18 living with them, 44.1% were married couples living together, 18.1% had a female householder with no husband present, 4.8% had a male householder with no wife present, and 32.9% were non-families. 28.8% of all households were made up of individuals, and 12.7% had someone living alone who was 65 years of age or older. The average household size was 2.49 and the average family size was 3.06.

The median age in the town was 34.7 years. 28.6% of residents were under the age of 18; 8.3% were between the ages of 18 and 24; 24.7% were from 25 to 44; 23.6% were from 45 to 64; and 14.6% were 65 years of age or older. The gender makeup of the town was 46.6% male and 53.4% female.

2000 census
As of the census of 2000, there were 2,061 people, 858 households, and 548 families living in the town. The racial makeup of the town was 98.30% White, 0.39% African American, 0.29% Native American, 0.19% Asian, 0.19% from other races, and 0.63% from two or more races. Hispanic or Latino people of any race were 0.44% of the population.

There were 858 households, out of which 30.8% had children under the age of 18 living with them, 48.8% were married couples living together, 12.0% had a female householder with no husband present, and 36.1% were non-families. 32.3% of all households were made up of individuals, and 17.7% had someone living alone who was 65 years of age or older. The average household size was 2.33 and the average family size was 2.94.

In the town, the population was spread out, with 24.7% under the age of 18, 9.5% from 18 to 24, 26.2% from 25 to 44, 20.4% from 45 to 64, and 19.2% who were 65 years of age or older. The median age was 37 years. For every 100 females, there were 87.9 males. For every 100 females age 18 and over, there were 79.3 males.

The median income for a household in the town was $30,296, and the median income for a family was $35,817. Males had a median income of $31,038 versus $20,430 for females. The per capita income for the town was $15,440. About 8.2% of families and 11.0% of the population were below the poverty line, including 17.5% of those under age 18 and 7.4% of those age 65 or over.

Education
The town has a lending library, the Union County Public Library.

The town is also home to Union County Elementary School, Union County Middle School, and Union County High School.

Notable people
 Ambrose Burnside, General in the Union Army during the Civil War, governor and U.S. Senator from Rhode Island.
 Chad Collyer, professional wrestler and mentalist
 Jay Hall Connaway, realist painter known for painting landscapes of Maine
 Walter F. Bossert, attorney, Grand Dragon of the Ku Klux Klan during the 1920s
 Samuel Duvall, competed in the 1904 Summer Olympics
 Bob Jenkins, former NASCAR and IndyCar announcer
 Frederick L. Martin first commander of First aerial circumnavigation of the globe and commander of US Army Air Forces during the Attack on Pearl Harbor
 William McKendree Snyder American painter active in Indiana in the late 19th and early 20th centuries best known for detailed Indiana landscapes

In popular culture
 In Episode 2 of Series 2 of BBC's Sherlock, "The Hounds of Baskerville", a CIA research project is discovered to have taken place in Liberty.

References

External links

Towns in Indiana
Towns in Union County, Indiana
County seats in Indiana